DeMario Minter (born  February 20, 1984) is a former American football cornerback. He was originally drafted by the Cleveland Browns in the fifth round of the 2006 NFL Draft. He played college football at Georgia.

Minter has also been a member of the Kansas City Chiefs, Arizona Cardinals and Florida Tuskers.

Early years
Minter played high school football at Stephenson High School in Stone Mountain, Georgia,

College career
Minter played college football for the Georgia Bulldogs and garnered First-team All-SEC honors by the Associated Press in 2005.

Professional career

Cleveland Browns
In 2006, during a pre-training camp workout with the Browns, Minter suffered a season-ending knee injury. On September 1, 2007, he was released by the Browns.

Florida Tuskers
Minter was signed by the Florida Tuskers of the United Football League on September 3, 2009. He was released on September 22.

References

External links
Arizona Cardinals bio 
Florida Tuskers bio

1984 births
Living people
People from Stone Mountain, Georgia
Players of American football from Georgia (U.S. state)
Sportspeople from DeKalb County, Georgia
American football cornerbacks
Georgia Bulldogs football players
Cleveland Browns players
Kansas City Chiefs players
Arizona Cardinals players
Florida Tuskers players